Neoplecostomus granosus is a species of South American armored catfish where it is possibly found in Brazil.  This species grows to a length of  SL.

References
 

granosus
Fish of South America
Taxa named by Achille Valenciennes
Fish described in 1840